Bembidion zephyrum is a species of ground beetle found in British Columbia, Canada and California, Oregon and Washington of the United States.

References

Further reading

zephyrum
Beetles of North America
Beetles described in 1910